Chitram! Bhalare Vichitram!! a 1991 Indian Telugu-language comedy film directed by P. N. Ramachandra Rao. It features an ensemble cast consisting of Naresh, Rajeevi, Subhalekha Sudhakar, Tulasi, Brahmanandam, Bindu Gosh, Maharshi Raghava, Jaya Latha and Kota Srinivasa Rao. The film is based on the Marathi film Ashi Hi Banwa Banwi by V. Shantaram Productions.

The film was successful at the box office. Naresh went onto to win Nandi Special Jury Award for his performance in the film. It was later remade into Kannada as Bombat Hendthi (1992) and  Tamil as Aanazhagan (1995).

Plot 
Raja (Naresh), Sudhakar (Subhalekha Sudhakar), Raghava (Maharshi Raghava), and Brahmanandam (Brahmanandam) are friends and are tenants in Gorojanala Garudachalam's house (Kota Srinivasa Rao). After being thrown out of the house, they start searching for a new house for rent, but no one is ready to rent out their house to bachelors.

Finally, they end up in a place where the landlady insists on having a family as her tenants. The four bachelors dress up to be a man (Sudhakar), his retarded brother (Raghava), his father (Brahmanandam) and his wife "Prema" (Raja). Raja's girlfriend happens to be the landlady's daughter, and all hell breaks loose.

Cast

Soundtrack 
Vidyasagar, a relatively newcomer at that time, gave a few really good tunes with the notable ones being  "Seetalu Yerugani" and "Maddela Daruvei". The melodious former, sung by Sailaja and Chitra, and shot on the occasion of Prema's Seemantam ceremony, which is still being played at Seemantam functions in Hyderabad, is borrowed from the Marathi original tune "Kuneetari YeNaara YeNaara guh" (shot similarly on a Godh-barai), beautifully customised to suit the Telugu/South Indian taste.
 "Brahmachaarulam"
 "Navvukune Mana"
 "Mahasaya Mathuga"
 "Maddela Daruvei"
 "Seetalu Yerugani"

Impact 
Comedian Brahmanadam's phrase "Nee Yenkamma" became popular with this film.

Accolades 
Nandi Awards
 Nandi Special Jury Award (actor) – Naresh (1991)

References

External links 
 

1990s buddy comedy films
1990s romantic comedy-drama films
1990s Telugu-language films
1991 films
Cross-dressing in Indian films
Films scored by Vidyasagar
Indian buddy comedy films
Indian romantic comedy-drama films
Telugu films remade in other languages
Telugu remakes of Marathi films